Joan Marshall (born Joan Schrepfermann; June 6, 1931 – June 28, 1992) was an American film and television actress. She is best known for her appearances in The Twilight Zone's "Dead Man's Shoes", and Star Trek's "Court Martial".

Early life
She was born Joan Schrepfermann on June 6, 1931 in Chicago, where she was also raised. At age 17, she suffered a bout of polio which temporarily paralyzed her vocal cords, leaving her unable to speak. She began her career performing as a showgirl in Chicago clubs.

Career
After appearing as a dancer in the film The Chicago Kid (1945) and in a part in the television series Have Gun – Will Travel (1958), she moved to California around 1959. In 1959 she reprised the Lauren Bacall role of Sailor Duval in the short-lived television series Bold Venture. During the 1960s, Marshall frequently guest-starred on various television series, including Tales of Wells Fargo, Maverick, Surfside 6, Hawaiian Eye, Gunsmoke, and The Jack Benny Program. She also appeared in the films Homicidal (using the stage name "Jean Arless") and Tammy and the Doctor opposite Sandra Dee and Peter Fonda.

Marshall also appeared in the 15-minute unaired pilot of The Munsters as Phoebe Munster (who strongly resembled Morticia Addams). Before the series was picked up, The Munsters was retooled and Marshall was replaced by actress Yvonne De Carlo. Marshall continued guest-starring in episodic television throughout the 1960s before her last role in the 1975 film Shampoo with Warren Beatty. She also worked as Barbra Streisand's personal assistant on her self-produced 1976 film A Star Is Born.

Personal life and death
Marshall was married five times. She had three children with her first two husbands. Marshall's third marriage was to director Hal Ashby in August 1969; she divorced him a year later in 1970, and married for a fourth time to Jeffrey A. Stein in 1978, whom she also divorced. In 1990 she married for a fifth time, this time to executive Mel Bartfield. The couple relocated to Montego Bay, Jamaica, where they remained until her death, at age 61, on June 28, 1992.

Filmography

References

External links
 

 
 Will the Real Jean Arless Please Step Forward? - TCM Movie Morlocks on "Homicidal"

1931 births
1992 deaths
20th-century American actresses
Actresses from Chicago
American film actresses
American television actresses
American expatriates in Jamaica